Eduard Cristian Avram (born 11 March 2003) is a Romanian professional footballer who plays for ACS Mediaș.

References

External links
 

2001 births
Living people
People from Mediaș
Romanian footballers
Romania youth international footballers
Association football defenders
Liga I players
CS Gaz Metan Mediaș players